Ingeniero Juan Guillermo Villasana National Airport  is a national airport located in Pachuca, Pachuca, Mexico. The airport handles the national traffic of the city of Pachuca.

Information
Inaugurated in 1975 and named in honor of the engineer and aviator Juan Guillermo Villasana, the airport deals with the local and national air traffic of Pachuca. It has aviation school and air taxi services.

See also 

List of airports in Mexico

References

External links

Airports in Mexico
Pachuca
Transportation in Hidalgo